Two vessels of the Royal Navy have been named HMS Spiraea after the shrub:

  was an  sloop launched in 1917 and sold in 1922.
  was a  launched in 1940 and sold in 1945.

References
 

Royal Navy ship names